Rouen Hockey Élite 76 (also known as the Dragons de Rouen (Rouen Dragons)) is a French ice hockey team based in Rouen playing in the Ligue Magnus.

The team was founded in 1982 and plays home games at the Île Lacroix.

History
Only 3 years after its founding, the club, then named RHC (Rouen Hockey Club), reached the French elite championship in 1985. It has remained at this level since, being the club with the second-most consecutive years at this level, behind Amiens.

Rouen won its first French league title in 1990, starting a run of 7 consecutive finals with 5 league titles, winning the title in 1990 and 1992 through 1995, while finishing runner-up in 1991 and 1996. During that era, the club enjoyed much success, participating in European tournaments, and winning the European League Cup in 1996, and the Atlantic league in 1995 and 1996.

Rouen had less success in the second half of the 1990s, but since then has returned to its winning ways. The team won 11 additional French league titles: 2001, 2003, 2006, 2008, 2010 through 2013, 2016, 2018 and 2021. During the 2005-2006 season, the team achieved the rare feat of being unbeaten, winning all of their regular season matches except for one tie, and sweeping their opponents in the playoffs.

With 16 titles, Rouen has the third-most elite championship titles of any French city, trailing only Chamonix (30 titles) and Paris (18), although Paris won its titles with 8 different teams.

Roster 
Updated February 13, 2019.

Trophies and awards

France

- Ligue Magnus (French Championship): 1990, 1992, 1993, 1994, 1995, 2001, 2003, 2006, 2008, 2010, 2011, 2012, 2013, 2016, 2018, 2021

- French Cup: 2002, 2004, 2005, 2011, 2015, 2016

- League Cup: 2008, 2010, 2013, 2014

Europe

- Cup of European Leagues: 1996

- Atlantic league: 1995, 1996

- IIHF Continental Cup: 2012, 2016

Notable players
Luc Tardif

References

External links
 Official website 

Ice hockey teams in France
Sport in Rouen
Ice hockey clubs established in 1982
1982 establishments in France